Clyde was a station on Metra's BNSF Railway Line. The station was located at 29th Street and Austin Boulevard, in Cicero, Illinois. In Metra's zone-based fare system, Clyde was located in zone B, on the west end of the Cicero Railroad Yard. Clyde closed on April 1, 2007, due to low ridership; to compensate for the loss of the station, Metra announced that it would rehabilitate the adjacent Cicero and LaVergne stations.

Ridership was only 64 passengers on an average weekday around the time of the station's closure

References

Metra stations in Illinois
Former Chicago, Burlington and Quincy Railroad stations
Railway stations closed in 2007
Railway stations in Cook County, Illinois
Railway stations in the United States opened in 1978